Nicholas Peter Collingwood Maughan (born January 1980) is a British investor, philanthropist and conservationist.

He is the founder of an ESG investment company Maughan Capital and the Nick Maughan Foundation, a self-funded charity working in education, environment, and civic support areas for disenfranchised communities. 

Nick Maughan is also the founder of BoxWise, Britain’s largest boxing-related non-profit that works with disadvantaged youth through sport;  and a trustee of Tusk Trust, an African wildlife conservation charity.

Biography 

Maughan was born in January 1980 in London, England. He gained a first-class degree in Religion and Theology at Manchester University, before graduating with a master’s degree in Investment Management from Cass Business School (now Bayes Business School).

Career 
Maughan started his career in 2003 as a quantitative analyst at Tamiso & Co in New York City and has since lived and worked in at least six other countries, including Bulgaria, the Bahamas and Italy.

In 2020, he founded Maughan Capital to target investments into companies that bring social and environmental impact. 

Portfolio companies include Forests For Mines Ltd, which converts old coal mines into newly planted forests, and start-up carbon credit trading exchange Climate Solutions Exchange (CSX), of which he is also a director. Other portfolio companies include Beobia Ltd, trading as The Bug Factory, an English start-up that recycles refrigerators and freezers into hardware for the growth of mealworm. Mealworm is used as an alternative source of sustainable animal protein with a low-carbon footprint that, unlike soy, does not require the clearing of rainforests for its production.

Philanthropy 
Maughan established The Nick Maughan Foundation (NMF.org) in 2020 as a privately funded philanthropic initiative centred around the three pillars of education, environment, and community. NMF’s advisory board includes Lord St. John of Bletso, Edward King of the European Climate Foundation, Nomatemba Tambo (daughter of Oliver Tambo), Bim Afolami and Michael Farrant of Farrant Group.

Education & community 
NMF launched its flagship initiative BoxWise in 2020, founded by Nick Maughan and Rick Ogden.

BoxWise offers a 10-week boxing programme delivered entirely by England Boxing coaches, which helps young people with their personal fitness and mental wellbeing, while also supporting them to attain educational qualifications and step into gainful employment. Working closely with local police and social services for referrals, BoxWise is active in 42 locations across the UK, with two of its centers offering adaptive boxing classes to enable disabled young people to participate in the program. Its sites include five across London, and venues in Glasgow, Sheffield, Manchester, East Middlesbrough, Telford, Birmingham, and Wales.

In 2022, BoxWise went international opening venues in South Africa, Uganda, and Ireland with programmes in Brazil and Tanzania launching in 2023. Amongst the programmes offered are a course in Eastleigh Boxing Club dedicated to helping Ukrainian refugees adjust to life in the U.K., and a number of female only courses aiming to encourage girls to pick up the sport.

BoxWise’s Advisory Board includes Mishcon de Reya’s Head of Mishcon Purpose Alexander Rhodes, and Lord St. John of Bletso. BoxWise is also represented by celebrity ambassadors that include professional boxers Lawrence Okolie, Joshua Buatsi, and Hannah Rankin as well as entrepreneur Ayo Gordon.

Maughan’s other community philanthropy initiatives include supporting the Glasgow based Charlie Miller Football Academy. Maughan is also a major donor to the youth support charity Berkshire Youth Trust, through which he has contributed to the Trust’s reconstruction of the Waterside Centre in Newbury.

He has contributed substantial sums to the development of social infrastructure projects in Eastern Uganda, including the largest maternity hospital in the region, the Nick Maughan Maternity Centre and the NMF Riverside School.

Maughan also funds academically gifted children from low-income families to attend elite private schools in London, including Putney High.

Environmental 
Maughan donates substantially to African conservation initiatives, including a £1m donation to Tusk Trust, of which Maughan is a trustee.

He also matched all donations up to £150,000 made to Tusk through The Times newspaper’s Annual Christmas Appeal.

Maughan also sponsors the annual Tusk Wildlife Ranger Award, which recognises an individual working in the field to protect Africa’s wildlife.

Other interests 
Maughan is a horology enthusiast. His watch collection includes what was at the time the most expensive British wristwatch ever to be sold at auction, the George Daniels Millennium watch, which was sold at Bonhams in June 2021 for £519,000. That record was subsequently surpassed when an identical time piece was sold for CHF 828,600 plus auctioneers commission at Phillips Geneva on the 6th of November 2022.

References 

1980 births
Living people
21st-century British businesspeople
British financial analysts
British financial company founders